Melik Ohanian (in Armenian Մելիք Օհանյան, in Western Armenian Օհանեան; born 1969 in France) is a French contemporary artist of Armenian origin. He lives and works in Paris and New York City. His work has been shown in many solo exhibitions including Galerie Chantal Crousel, Centre Pompidou and Palais de Tokyo in Paris, South London Gallery in London, De Appel in Amsterdam, IAC in Villeurbanne, Yvon Lambert in New York, Museum in Progress in Vienna, and Matucana 100 in Santiago de Chile.

His art work includes Island of an Island (1998–2002) following the volcanic eruption on the island of Surtsey in 1963, Seven Minutes Before (2004), Invisible Film (2005) (a tribute to filmmaker Peter Watkins particularly Watkin' film Punishment Park) and From the Voice to the Hand (2008).

He has also taken part in a large number of group exhibitions around the world, in particular the 52nd and 56th Venice Biennale (representing France and Armenia), the São Paulo Biennial (representing France), the Berlin and Sydney biennials in 2004, Moscow and Lyon biennials in 2005 and Gwangju and Seville biennials in 2006.

Solo exhibitions
2018
Les Réverbères de la Mémoire, Trembley Park, Geneva, Switzerland
2016
Under Shadows, Marcel Duchamp Award 2015, Centre Pompidou, Paris, France
2015
Days, I See what I Saw and what I will See, Art Unlimited, Basel, Switzerland
Memory, Republic of Armenia Pavilion, 56. Venice Biennale
Datcha Project — A Zone of No Production, Special Session, Armenia
Stuttering, Galerie du Château, Domaine de Chaumont-sur-Loire, France
2014
Stutttering, Galerie Chantal Crousel & La Douane, Paris, France
Stuttering, Centre d’Art Régional Contemporain L-R, Sète, France
Welcome To Hanksville, Utah Museum of Contemporary Art, Salt Lake City, United States
Datcha Project — A Zone of No Production, Session #005, Armenia
2013
Points d’Intentions, Centre d’Art – Les Eglises, Chelles, France
2012
Days, I See what I Saw and what I will See, Lo Schermo dell’Arte Film Festival, Florence, Italy
In The Desert of Images, Mumbai Art Room, Mumbai, India
Points d’Intentions, Centre d’Art – Les Eglises, Chelles, France
Concrete Tears, 3451, Musée National Pablo Picasso, Chapelle Vallauris, France
2011{display : none;}, Galerie Ecole des Beaux Arts de Montpellier, FranceDays, I See what I Saw and what I will See, Galerie Chantal Crousel, Paris, FranceDatcha Project, Session #004, ArmeniaPeripherical Communities, London, Rich Mix, London, UK
2010Cadence Modulaire – Public Art – UPR – Hôpital Saint-Antoine, Paris, FranceLightbox, Centre Pompidou, Paris, FranceDatcha Project, Session #002, ArmeniaDatcha Project, Session #003, Armenia
2009Blank, Melik Ohanian & Romain Kronenberg, Paris, FranceFrom The Voice to The Hand**, In Between, Centre Musical Goutte d’Or – Barbara, Paris, FranceDatcha Project, Session #001, Armenia
2008El Agua de Niebla, Matucana 100, Santiago, ChileDatcha Project, Session #000, ArmeniaFrom The Voice to The Hand, a co-existent exhibitions project of 15 venues at the same time, Paris, France
Le Plateau / FRAC Ile-De-France, Paris, France
Abbaye de Maubuisson, Paris, France
MAC/VAL, Ivry sur Seine, France
Collection, Centre Pompidou, Paris
Cité Nationale de l’Histoire de l’Immigration, Paris, France
Galerie de Multiples, Paris, France
Association FACE, La Courneuve, Paris, France
Cinéma l’Entrepot, Paris, France
Le CentQuatre, Paris, France
Yvon Lambert – Librairie, Paris, France
200737 seconds- Melik Ohanian, CCA Kitakyushu, Japan
Harun Farucki & Melik Ohanian, Lunds Konsthall, Sweden
2006Seven Minutes Before, South London Gallery, London, UK(M)UT(E)OPIA, Galerie Chantal Crousel, Paris, FranceSomewhere In Time, De Appel, Amsterdam, NetherlandsLet's Turn or Turn Around, IAC Villeurbanne, France
2005ArtPace, San Antonio, USAWith Sean Snyder and Pia Ronicke, Fruit Market Gallery, Edinburgh, ScotlandA Moment as an Event, PERFORMA 05, New York, USA
2004Seven Minutes Before, French Pavillon XXVIe São Paulo Biennale, BrazilRevolving Analogia, Yvon Lambert Gallery, New York, USA{T}HERE, Centre pour l’image Contemporaine, Saint Gervais, Geneva, SwitzerlandWelcome to Hanksville, Galerie Dvir, Tel Aviv, Israel
2003SlowMotion, from Slave to Valse, CCA Kitakyushu, JapanWelcome To Hanksville, Studio Yvon Lambert, ParisSound Billboard, Museum in Progress, Vienna, AustriaYou are mY destinY, The Atlanta College of Art, Atlanta, USAAlightningtruckonablueracetrack, Galerie BF15, Lyon, France
2002Nightsnow, Galerie Navona, Rome, ItalyIsland of an Island, Art Unlimited, Basel, SwitzerlandNightsnow, Galerie Chantal Crousel, ParisIsland of an Island and Peripherical Communities, Palais de Tokyo, Paris, France Freezing Film, FRAC, Montpellier, France

Group exhibitions
2017I travelled the world and the seven seas, Royal Antwerp Atheneum, BelgiumBorderland, Mondes Flottants, 14th Lyon Biennale, Lyon, FrancePaysages du monde, Marcel Duchamp Award nominees, Espace Musées, Aéroport Paris-Charles de Gaulle, FranceDe quoi l’image est-elle le nom ?, Biennale du Mois de la Photo, Montreal, CanadaTranshumance, Centre international d'art et du paysage de Vassivière, France
2016Dreamlands: Immersive cinema and art, 1905-2016, Whitney Museum, New York, USAIl y a de l’autre, Les Rencontres d'Arles, Atelier des Forges, France20th Biennale of Sydney, Sydney, Australia
2015Prix Marcel Duchamp 2015, FIAC, Grand Palais, ParisL’Effet Vertigo, MAC/VAL, Vitry-sur-Seine, FranceLà où commence le jour, LaM, Villeneuve d’Ascq, FranceAllures, Les Turbulences, FRAC Centre, Orléans, FranceL’heure qu’il est, Centre d'Art Contemporain, Yverdon-les-bains, SwitzerlandLe Point De Fuite De l’Histoire, Centre d’Art et Photographie, Lectoure, France Prix Marcel Duchamp, Carré d’Art, Nîmes, France
2014Music Palace, the power of music seen by visual artists, curated by Diana Wiegersma, Fondation Boghossian, Villa Empain, Brussels, BelgiumSimples gestes, curated by Jean de Loisy and Sandra Adam-Couralet, La Grande Place, Musée du cristal Saint-Louis, Saint-Louis-lès-bitche, FranceDer Blitz, curated by Denis Isaia and Federico Mazzonelli, Galleria Civica G. Segantini, Arco Di Trento, ItalyEntre-temps, l'artiste narrateur, curated by Angeline Scherf and Odile Burluraux, MOCA Chengdu, ChinaDes choses en moins, des choses en plus, curated by Sebastien Faucon and Agnès Violeau, Palais de Tokyo, Paris, FranceIlots d'Utopies: Un esprit Jaurès, Musée / Centre du Verre, Carmaux, France
2013All About These..., Viafarini Docva, Milan, ItalySound Design For Future Films, Et al., San Francisco, USAEl Agua De Niebla, Scotiabank Nuit Blanche, Toronto, CanadaSans Matières Ajoutées by About Blank, CNEAI, Paris, FranceLe Pont, Musée d'Art Contemporain, Marseille, FranceHoney I rearranged the collection, Passage de Retz, Paris, FranceBande à part, Galerie Chantal Crousel, Paris, FranceLibération Annlee, Ecole Supérieure des Beaux-Arts, Montpellier, FranceTireless Refrain, Nam June Paik Art Center, KoreaIm Dreaming About a Reality, La Douane, Galerie Chantal Crousel, Paris, France
2012In spite of it all, Sharjah Art Foundation, Sharjah, UAECollection'12, Institut d’art contemporain, Villeurbanne, FranceOilScapes, Peacock Visual Arts, Centre for Contemporary Art, Scotland, UKThe Eyes of the Soul - A selection of works from the collection of Isabelle and Jean-Conrad Lemaître, Fundació Godia, Barcelona, SpainA Blind Spot, curated by Catherine David, Berlin Documentary Forum, Haus der Kulturen der Welt, Berlin, GermanyNéon, Who’s afraid of red, yellow and blue ?, La Maison Rouge, Paris, FranceLiving With Video, curated by Chantal Crousel, Pavillon Downtown, Dubai, UAE
2011J’ai Deux Amours, Cité Nationale de l’Histoire de l’Immigration, Paris, FranceEl Agua de Niebla, FIAC 2011, Jardin des Tuileries, Paris, FranceEntre-Temps, L’artiste Narrateur, Collection MAM Paris, Taipei, TaiwanAtmosphères, Collection FRAC Rhône-Alpes, Romans, FranceEntre-Temps, L’artiste Narrateur, Collection MAM Paris, Minsheng, Shanghai, ChinaNuages, Cité Radieuse, Marseille, FranceMagical Consciousness, Arnolfini, Bristol, UK
10. Sharjah Biennal, Sharjah, United Arab Emirates
2010Collection, MAC VAL, ParisPersistence of Vision II, Nikolaj Contemporary Art, Copenhagen, DenmarkL'Homme Debout, Galerie Chantal Crousel, FIAC, ParisStill/Moving, The Israel Museum, Jerusalem, IsraelSound Design for Future Films, Wexner Center for the Arts Columbus, Ohio, USPersistence of Vision I, FACT, Liverpool, UKTelling Stories, WUK Kunsthalle, Vienna, Austria
2009America, Beirut Art Center, LebanonL’Attraction de l’Espace, Musée d’Art Moderne, Saint-Etienne, FranceEntre-Temps, L’artiste Narrateur, Collection du Musée d’Art Moderne de la Ville de Paris MIS/Paco de Artes, São Paulo et Oi Futuro, Rio de Janeiro, BrazilBehind The Image, The Image Behind, ArteFact Festival, STUK Kunstencentrum, Leuven, BelgiumLos Tiempos de un Lugar, Centro de Arte y Naturaleza, Fundacion Beulas, Huesca, Spain
2008Interstitial Zone, Argos, Bruxelles, BelgiqueLa Scène Française 1980-2008, Réfléchir Le Monde, Centrale Electrique, Bruxelles, BelgiqueSound Design for Future Films, Moderna Museet, Stockholm, SwedenU-Turn, Quadriennal de Copenhagen, DenmarkDu Jardin au Cosmos, L'Espace d'Art Concret, Mouans-Sartoux, FranceThe Space of Man, Fondation Merz, Torino, ItalyRe-Make/Re-Model, Courtisane Film Festival, Gent, BelgiumLocked-In, Casino Luxembourg, LuxembourgVoice and Void, Galerie Im Taxipalais, Innsbruck, AustriaCollection08, IAC Villeurbanne, FranceCollateral 2, SESC Paulista, São Paulo, BrazilPerform History, U-Turn at Overgaden, Copenhagen, Denmark
2007Fiction Vs Reality, Centre d’Art Moderne, Fondation Calouste Gulbenkian, LisbonnePassages, Hommage à Walter Benjamin, Gandy Gallery Bratislava, SlovakiaPlayback, Musée d’Art Moderne, ParisIntrusions, Collection FMAC, Petit Palais, ParisVoice and Void, The Aldrich Contemporary Art Museum (CT) Ridgefield, USAOn the limits of politics and possibilities of resistance, 04. Goteborg Biennale, Sweden
Collection, MAC VAL Musée d’Art Contemporain de Vitry, FrancePoeziezomers, Watou, BelgiumBorderline-Moving Image, Beijing Center for Creativity, ChinaThink with the senses, Venice Biennale, Feel with the mind, Venise, ItalyCritical Foreground, New Langhton Arts San Francisco, USThe Hand, National Museum of Fine Arts, Riga, LatviaOn Peter Watkins, Galerie Martin Janda, Vienna, AustriaAir de Paris, Centre Georges Pompidou, Beaubourg, ParisCentre of the Creative Universe: Liverpool and the Avant-Garde, TATE Liverpool, UKParabol Magazine #2, Vienna, AustriaCollateral, When Art looks at Cinema, Hangar Bicocca, Milan, Italy
2006
02. Biennale of Sevilla, Spain
06. Biennale of Gwangju, KoreaDatcha Project, Armenia Tell Me, Casino Luxembourg, LuxembourgHuman Games, Fondazione Pitti in Firenze, ItalyUndo Redo, Kunsthalle Fridericianum Kassel, GermanySeven Minutes Before, Outdoor projection in Vercors, FranceNegative Space, Extended, by Susane Burner Kunstmuseums Bonn, GermanySatellites of Love, Witte de Whit, Rotterdam, Netherland25 Peaces, billboard project, Vienna, Austria
2005
Collection, MAC VAL Musée d’Art Contemporain de Vitry, France
Rencontres Internationales des Arts Multimédia, Marseille, FranceLeçon Zéro, Galerie Chantal Crousel, Paris  Istmo, Galerie Vermelho, São Paulo, BrazilExperiencing Duration, 08. Biennale de Lyon, FranceDialectic of Hope, 01. Biennale de Moscou, RussiaTell Me, MNBA Québec, Canada
October Art Salon, Belgrade, SerbiaMultipistes, Palais des Beaux Arts, Bruxelles, BelgiumNach Rokytník, EVN Collection, MUMOK Wien, AustriaEngland Land Marks, Greengrassi Gallery, London, UKRemagine, Collection du FNAC, Musée d’Art Contemporain de Lyon, France
Collection, Macro-Mattatoio, Rome, ItalyDocumentary Creations, Kunst museum, Luzern, SwitzerlandUniversal Experience, MCA Chicago, USA
2004ReasonEmotion, 14. Biennale de Sydney, Australia
03. Biennale de Berlin, Germany
04. Biennale de Pontevedra, SpainCommunautés, IAC Villeurbanne, FranceMediterraneo, Macro-Mattatoio, Rome, ItalyNuit Blanche, Paris, France  Eblouissement, Jeu de Paume, Paris
2003Geographies # 3, Galerie Chantal Crousel, Paris, FranceFreezing Film, Gare de Lyon, Festival d’Automne, Paris, FranceThrough the Eye of a Needle, Galerie Chantal Crousel, Paris, France
Collective Exhibition, CRAC Sète, FranceEmbassy, Galleri F15, Moss, Norway
2O ans des FRAC, Musée d’art Contemporain de Strasbourg, FranceMoltitudini–Solitudini, Museion, Museo d’arte contemporanea Bolzano, ItalyNo Ghost Just a Shell, Van Abbe Museum, Eindhoven, Pays-Bas / SF Moma, San Francisco, U.S.A
ARCO, Madrid, Spain
2002No Ghost Just a Shell, Institute for Visual Culture, Cambridge, EnglandToasting Agency at Openspace, Curated by Alexis Vaillant Piazza Duomo, Milan, ItalyNo ghost Just a Shell, Kunsthalle Zürich, Switzerland / SF MoMA, San Francisco, USA  Migration de l’image, Erevan, ArmeniaHaunted House, curated by Gabriel Lester, Outline, Amsterdam, NetherlandsStories, Haus der Kunst, Munich, GermanyLess Ordinary, Artsonje Center, Seoul, Museum of Modern Art, Kyungju, Korea
2001Traversées, ARC, Musée d'Art Moderne de la Ville de ParisA comme Accident, Galerie Chantal Crousel, ParisRencontres Vidéo, Galerie Piazza Navona, Rome, Italy
2000
Institut d’art Contemporain de Villeurbanne, Residency in Die, Drôme, FranceSoirée Nomade, Fondation Cartier pour l’Art Contemporain, Paris
1999ThirtyFiveSecondsLater Interval Program, MAC Lyon, France
Icono Festival Printemps du Québec à Paris, Metro Stalingrad, France
1998
Collective Exhibition, Galerie Jennifer Flay, Paris, FranceJunge Szene 98, Secession, Vienna, AustriaIn Vitro, Glassbox, Paris, France
1997Mobile TV, with Pierre Huygue, Le Consortium, Dijon, FranceHistoires en Forme, Le Magasin, Grenoble, FranceGalerie de Portraits, Collection FRAC Rhône-Alpes, France
01. Biennale du Montenegro, Cetinje, Montenegro
1996Bande Sonore pour un Film Potentiel, with Pierre Huyghe, Le Hall, ENBA Lyon, France
Arte Fiera di Bologna, Galerie Nuova Icona, Bologna, Italy
1995Critique, Critique, Post-diplôme, Ecole Nationale des Beaux-Arts de Lyon, France
Cité de l’image, Lyon-Vaise / Galeria Nuova Icona, Venice, Italy08152758, Embarcadère, Lyon, France

Public art
2010-2018: Les Réverbères de la Mémoire, Armenian Génocide Memorial, Parc Trembley, Geneva
2009-2010: Cadence Modulaire, UPR – Hopital Saint-Antoine, Paris, France
2008: Second Time & Second Sound, Piscine de Belleville, Paris - architectes Berger&Anziutti
2008: Philosophic DUB, Atelier de Création Radiophonique, France Culture, Paris
2008: Cosmoball, Abbaye de Maubuisson, Saint-Ouen l'Aumone, France
2008: Rosa Park Tribute, Collège Rosa Parks, Gentilly, Val de Marne, France
2003-2007: Le Récit Perpétuel, Talence, Bordeaux, France

Grants and residencies

Prix Marcel Duchamp – Paris, France, 2015
Golden Lion for the best National Pavilion (Republic of Armenia), 56.Venice Biennale – Venice, Italy, 2015
Montalvo Arts Center, Sally and Don Lucas Artist Program – San Francisco, USA, 2007
CCA Kitakyushu – Fukuoka, Japan, 2007
Prize of October Art Salon – Belgrade, Serbia, 2005
Artpace – San Antonio, USA, 2005
Villa Medicis, Rome, Italy, 2003–2004
CCA KitaKyushu – Fukuoka, Japan, 2003
FIACRE, French Ministry of Culture – Paris, France 2002
IAC Villeurbanne Residency – Die, France, 2000
Image en Mouvement CNC/DAP, French Pavillon XXVIe São Paulo Biennal – São Paulo, Brazil 2000
Prix Linossier, Ecole des Beaux Arts de Lyon – Lyon, France, 1995

Books

2009: From The Voice to The Hand, a co-existent exhibition, Paris 2008 Co-produced by Abbaye de Maubuisson, Le Plateau / FRAC Ile-De-France. Ed. Archibook, Paris  
2005: SlowMotion, from Slave to Valse, Ed.CCA Kitakyushu, Japan
2005: Cosmograms, Melik Ohanian et Jean Christophe Royoux, Ed.Lukas & Sternberg, New York Cosmograms Newspaper Edition distributed by EXO, São Paulo, Brazil
2003: Kristale Company'', Monography, Edition HYX, Paris  (Edition HYX: Kristale Company by Melik Ohanian)

References

External links
Melik Ohanian Official website
Galerie Chantal Crousel - Melik Ohanian page

French contemporary artists
French people of Armenian descent
1969 births
Living people
Armenian artists